Lars G. Petersson (born 1951) is a Swedish-British human rights activist, blogger and book writer.

Career
He worked for the human rights organisation Amnesty International in Denmark. He focused on the treatment of refugees in Denmark and the campaign against the death penalty. Currently, he lives in London and is the co-founder of the BASTA-Kampagne.

Books
 Faneflugt dette er beretningen om viljestærke mænd, tre i særdeleshed, som deserterede, fordi de nægtede at kæmpe for Hitlers terrorregime det er også beretningen om et internationalt samfund, der vendte dem ryggen (2004, Frihedsmuseets Venners Forlag) (in Danish; published in English as Broken Oath)
 Deserters (2005, Danish Resistance Museum Publishing)
 AbuseUK (2010, Verlag Chipmunkapub)
 Musterung (2010, Verlag Chipmunkapub)
 Medical Rape (2010, Verlag Chipmunkapub)
 Hitlers Fahnenflüchtige (2012, Verlag Chipmunkapub)

References

External links
, his official website
BASTA (campaign of Petersson)

Date of birth missing (living people)
Place of birth missing (living people)
1951 births
20th-century Swedish writers
20th-century male writers
21st-century Swedish writers
Amnesty International people
Anti–death penalty activists

Swedish bloggers
Swedish expatriates in Denmark
Swedish expatriates in England
Swedish founders
Swedish human rights activists
Swedish military writers
Living people
Historians of World War II
Writers from London
Male bloggers